At the conclusion of the Obersalzberg Speech (1939), German dictator Adolf Hitler likely stated, "Who, after all, speaks today of the annihilation of the Armenians?" The veracity of the quote has been debated by scholars.

Background

The Armenian genocide was the systematic murder of around 1 million to 1.5 million ethnic Armenians in the Ottoman Empire during World War I.

Abram L. Sachar, an American historian and founding president of Brandeis University, wrote that "the genocide was cited approvingly twenty-five years later by the Fuehrer... who found the Armenian 'solution' an instructive precedent".  According to historian Stefan Ihrig, there is considerable evidence that Nazi worldview was shaped by the Turkish revolution and getting away with genocide.

Speech and version 

The version of the speech that includes the Armenian reference records Hitler as stating:

Nuremberg trial

The Nuremberg War Crimes Tribunal was provided with the first note of the speech by Louis Lochner, a journalist who had been based at the Berlin bureau of the Associated Press during the war. The document was labelled "L-3", and was one of three documents purporting to record the words spoken by Hitler in the Obersalzberg Speech. It decided not to admit it into evidence as Lochner could not disclose his source. In explaining its decision to the President of the court on Monday 26 November 1945, Prosecutor Sidney Alderman stated:

The first of the three documents came into our possession through the medium of an American newspaperman, and purported to be original minutes of this meeting at Obersalzberg, transmitted to this American newspaperman by some other person; and we had no proof of the actual delivery to the intermediary by the person who took the notes. That document, therefore, merely served to keep our prosecution on the alert, to see if it could find something better. Fortunately, we did get the other two documents, which indicate that Hitler on that day made two speeches, perhaps one in the morning, one in the afternoon, as indicated by the original minutes, which we captured. By comparison of those two documents with the first document, we conclude that the first document was a slightly garbled merger of the two speeches.

However, the version of the speech with the Armenian reference was reprinted in Nazi Conspiracy and Aggression.

Veracity 

Lochner had possessed a written record of the speech since August 1939. He had shown the speech to Sir George Ogilvie-Forbes, a British diplomat serving as counsellor and chargé d'affaires in the British embassy in Berlin from 1937 to 1939. Ogilvie-Forbes then transmitted the speech back to London in a letter dated 25 August 1939. In the letter, Ogilvie-Forbes refers to Lochner's informant as "a Staff Officer who received it from one of the Generals present at the [Obersalzberg] meeting".

During the interrogation of German Major General Karl Bodenschatz at Nuremberg on 7 November 1945, the interrogator recorded that Bodenschatz "expressed the view that the content of L-3 contained the thoughts of Hitler at this particular time and that he believed that document, L-3, was a copy of the speech that was delivered by Hitler on this particular day".

In his memoir Bis zum bitteren Ende ("To the Bitter End"), Hans Bernd Gisevius, a German diplomat and intelligence officer during the Second World War, wrote that Admiral Wilhelm Canaris, who had been present to hear Hitler's speech, had secretly taken notes of what was said.

, a German social researcher and political scientist, published a three-volume study (2006–08) on 20th century genocides that contained the document of the original German version of the Armenian quote (the L-3 text) for the first time. Albrecht concludes that the L-3-document "must be regarded as the [version] which most likely sums up and expresses what Hitler said". According to Albrecht, L-3 is most credible because Canaris was the only witness who wrote down what Hitler said simultaneously. Kevork B. Bardakjian, an expert in Armenian studies, also argues that the L-3 document originated in the notes secretly taken by Wilhelm Canaris during the meeting of 22 August 1939 and that it is "as sound as the other evidence submitted at Nuremberg".

In his 1987 survey of the historiography of the Holocaust, the Canadian historian Michael Marrus wrote that recent research pointed towards the authenticity of the L-3 document. Christopher Browning, an American historian of the Holocaust, stated in 2004 that the L-3 document, which contains the Armenian quote, is not likely to be an accurate version of what Hitler said but an "apocalyptic" version that was purposefully leaked by the Poles to gain the support of Western nations. German historian  cites the statement as evidence that Hitler believed that crimes committed during wartime would be overlooked. According to this interpretation, Hitler planned to unleash genocide upon the outbreak of war: "war would serve as a cover for extermination and the fighting would conceal the real war aim".

According to Margaret L. Anderson in 2010, Professor of History at the University of California, Berkeley, "we have no reason to doubt the remark is genuine" and that, regardless of whether it is, the Armenian Genocide had achieved "iconic status... as the apex of horrors imaginable in 1939" and that Hitler used it to persuade the German military that committing genocide might provoke condemnation but would lead to no serious consequences for the perpetrator nation. Historian Stefan Ihrig writes that the document containing the Armenian reference and its provenance is "sketchy, and the sentence in question is absent in other accounts of the meeting" but he adds that it is possible "that others did not write down this remark". Ihrig argues elsewhere that the Armenian genocide partially inspired the Holocaust but that there is "no smoking gun".

Legacy
The quote has often been cited, particularly by Armenians, to support the interpretation that Hitler was inspired by the Armenian Genocide to commit atrocities. International law expert Alexis Demirdjian sees the remark as "a depressing reminder of the effects of impunity".
The reference is now inscribed on one of the walls of the United States Holocaust Memorial Museum in Washington, D.C. In 2009 the International Association of Genocide Scholars used the quote in a letter to Barack Obama advocating recognition of the Armenian Genocide.

References

Sources

 

1939 in Germany
1939 works
Aftermath of the Armenian genocide
Speeches by Adolf Hitler
Political quotes